Donald D. Brown is a professor at the Carnegie Institution for Science and an adjunct professor at Johns Hopkins University. In 1956, he received an M.D. and an M.S. in biochemistry from the University of Chicago Medical School. He passed the State Medical Board Examination of Ohio that same year. He was a member of the American Academy of Arts and Sciences, the National Academy of Sciences, and the American Philosophical Society.

References

Living people
American embryologists
Johns Hopkins University faculty
Pritzker School of Medicine alumni
Year of birth missing (living people)

Members of the American Philosophical Society